Vincent Fenton (born March 26, 1990), known professionally as French Kiwi Juice or the abbreviation FKJ (sometimes stylized Fkj), is a French multi-instrumentalist, singer, and musician from the city of Tours. He is known for his solo live performances, where he does live loopings through Ableton Live and showcases his multi-instrumentalist skills.  His self-titled debut album, French Kiwi Juice, was released on March 3, 2017.

FKJ has performed at music festivals including Coachella, Euphoria, CRSSD, Lollapalooza, and Lightning in a Bottle.

Career 

FKJ has been described as a "pioneer" and "one of the flag bearers" of the new New French House genre. He was originally trained in sound engineering for film at a film school.

FKJ achieved significant public attention after the release of the fully improvised song "Tadow" and accompanying studio recording in 2017. He improvised the song with fellow musician Masego, during a day-long recording session that took place just after the musicians met each other.

In April 2017, FKJ announced that he was performing at the 2017 Coachella Valley Music and Arts Festival at the Do Lab Stage.

On April 7, 2022, FKJ performs on his new single "Greener" with Carlos Santana.

Personal life 
FKJ was born on March 26, 1990 to a mother from France and a father from New Zealand. From a young age, he immersed himself in music from his parents' libraries, including "English rock, Queen, Pink Floyd, The Police... '70s rock, Led Zeppelin... some jazz or Nina Simone, Billie Holiday, Miles Davis... a little bit of French music, but not too much, like Serge Gainsbourg."

In March 2019, FKJ married fellow musician June Marieezy (stage name ((( O )))) with whom he had previously collaborated, notably in "Vibin' Out".

Discography

Studio albums

EP

Singles

References

1991 births
Living people
French electronic musicians
French house musicians
21st-century French musicians
Musicians from Tours, France
Mom + Pop Music artists
French people of New Zealand descent